New Gold Mountain is an Australian drama miniseries which premiered on 13 October 2021 on SBS. The four-part miniseries is a Goalpost Television production which was created by Peter Cox, directed by Corrie Chen and executive produced by Kylie du Fresne.

Synopsis
New Gold Mountain tells a story about Chinese miners in the Ballarat Goldfields in 1855.

Cast

Main
 Yoson An as Leung Wei Shing
 Alyssa Sutherland as Belle Roberts
 Christopher James Baker as Patrick Thomas
 Sam Wang as Leung Wei Sun
 Mabel Li as Zhang Lei
 Chris Masters Mah as Gok
 Leonie Whyman as Hattie
 Rhys Muldoon as Commissioner Wright
 Alison Bell as Clara Wright
 Dan Spielman as Frederick Standish

Supporting
 Sebastian Li as Chen 
 Maria Angelico as Annie Thomas
 Freya Stafford as Rosie
 Travis Cotton as Frank Harken
 James Lau as Ah Chau
 John Orcsik as Gregor
 Li Weng as Mong Jun
 Mark Mitchell as Linus Cummins
 Paul Ireland as Ramsey
 Darcy Kent as Burke
 Conor Leach as Price
 Zach Blampied as Tom (Durrumang)

References

2021 Australian television series debuts
Cantonese-language television shows
Chinese-language television shows
English-language television shows
Fiction set in 1855
Mass media in Ballarat
Special Broadcasting Service original programming
Victoria (Australia) gold rushes
Television shows set in Victoria (Australia)